Don't Wanna Be Here was the first single for the band Cool for August and was also released as a CD single in Australia in 1997.  Contains the b-side cover of the Merle Haggard song, "You Don't Have Very Far to Go" which also appeared on the band's MilkinSorgin EP.

Track listing
"Don't Wanna Be Here" – 3:50
"Hope I'm Wrong" – 4:07
"You Don't Have Very Far to Go" – 3:59

1997 singles
Cool for August songs
1997 songs
Warner Records singles